= Swedish ship Hercules =

Several ships of the Swedish Navy have borne the name Hercules:

- Hercules (1651), a 50-gun ship, broken up in 1689
- Hercules (1659), a 64-gun ship, scuttled in 1710
